Merojapyx is a genus of diplurans in the family Japygidae.

Species
 Merojapyx porteri Silvestri, 1948
 Merojapyx riverosi Silvestri, 1948
 Merojapyx spegazzinii Silvestri, 1948

References

Diplura